Haunted Honeymoon is a 1986 American comedy horror film starring Gene Wilder, Gilda Radner, Dom DeLuise and Jonathan Pryce. Wilder also served as writer and director. The title Haunted Honeymoon was previously used for the 1940 U.S. release of Busman's Honeymoon based on the stage play by Dorothy L. Sayers.

Wilder and Radner play Larry Abbot and Vickie Pearle, two radio murder mystery actors who decide to get married. Larry, plagued with on-air panic attacks, is treated with a form of shock therapy and subsequently chooses to marry Vickie in a castle-like mansion which had been his childhood home. Once there, they meet the eccentric members of Larry's family, including his great-aunt Kate (DeLuise) and his cousin Charles (Pryce).

Honeymoon was distributed by Orion Pictures through a deal with HBO. The movie flopped  by grossing just short of its $9 million budget whilst it was panned by the critics. The movie earned DeLuise the Razzie Award for Worst Supporting Actress. The movie represents the last feature film appearance for Radner (prior to her diagnosis and death from ovarian cancer) and the last directorial role for Wilder.

Plot

Larry Abbot (Wilder) and Vickie Pearle (Radner) are performers on radio's "Manhattan Mystery Theater" who decide to get married. Larry has been plagued with on-air panic attacks and speech impediments since proposing marriage. Vickie thinks it is just pre-wedding jitters, but his affliction could get them both fired.

Larry's uncle, Dr. Paul Abbot, decides that Larry needs to be cured. Paul decides to treat him with a form of shock therapy to "scare him to death" in much the same way someone might try to startle someone out of hiccups.

Larry chooses a castle-like mansion in which he grew up as the site for their wedding. Vickie gets to meet Larry's eccentric family: great-aunt Kate (DeLuise in drag), who plans to leave all her money to Larry; his uncle, Francis; and Larry's cousins, Charles, Nora, Susan, and the cross-dressing Francis Jr. Also present are the butler Pfister and wife Rachel, the maid; Larry's old girlfriend Sylvia, who is now dating Charles; and Susan's magician husband, Montego the Magnificent.

Paul begins his "treatment" of Larry and lets others in on the plan. Unfortunately for all, something more sinister and unexpected is lurking at the Abbot Estates mansion. The pre-wedding party becomes a real-life version of Larry and Vickie's radio murder mysteries, werewolves and all.

Cast
Gene Wilder as Larry Abbot
Gilda Radner as Vickie Pearle
Dom DeLuise as Aunt Katherine "Kate" Abbot
Jonathan Pryce as Charles "Charlie" Abbot
Eve Ferret as Sylvia
Bryan Pringle as Pfister, the Butler
Peter Vaughan as Uncle Francis Abbot Sr.
Paul L. Smith as Dr. Paul Abbot, uncle
Jim Carter as Montego, the Magician
Jo Ross as Susan Abbot
Roger Ashton-Griffiths as Cousin Francis Jr.
Ann Way as Rachel, Pfister's wife
Matt Zimmerman as Radio Actor #1
Sally Osborne as Mrs. Abbot (Larry's mother)

Production

Development
Wilder wrote the opening scene while filming Silver Streak in 1976. He wanted to make a "comedy chiller" inspired by such films as The Cat and the Canary (1939), The Old Dark House (1932) and The Black Cat (1941), and radio shows like The Inner Sanctum. "Since I was 6 years old I have been scared of horror movies", said Wilder "And the movies that I liked the best – even though I was scared by them – were what was called then 'comedy-chillers.' They were horror movies yet they had comedy, or they were comedies and yet they had horror. They were not comedy-mysteries, they were not comedy-thrillers, they were comedy-chillers." Wilder says when he started writing the film "I knew I wanted it to be a comedy-chiller", but he struggled and the film wound up as an "autobiographical psycho/sexual comedy with music."

Wilder and Radner fell in love while making Hanky Panky (1982) and he decided to revisit the project as a vehicle for them both. "I always thought that Gilda has been one of our most brilliant television comediennes, but now I think she's becoming more than very good as a comic movie actress, which is a very, very different thing", said Wilder.

Wilder rewrote the script with writing partner, Terry Marsh. "I knew that I wanted it to be not a parody and not a satire, but to re-create a comedy-chiller", said Wilder. "I don't like naturalism. I like things that are fantastical – I'm not saying necessarily fantasies, but more than reality."

Wilder says the film was partly inspired by a song Jeanette MacDonald and Jack Buchanan sang in the film Monte Carlo (1930). Wilder says he heard it while watching the film in bed with Radner. "I'm always looking for some emotional spine to what I'm doing. I look over at her [Radner] and tears are coming down from her eyes. It was so sweet and innocent. Like little children. And I thought that's what this ('Haunted Honeymoon') is about."

"I couldn't imagine him singing it with any other girl", said Radner. "So, I just had a tantrum and said I had to be the fiancee – not a big tantrum, just a tiny tantrum."

He says he was also inspired by seeing Jean Cocteau's Beauty and the Beast in the early 1980s. "The world opened up for me", he said. "I'm more comfortable when I don't have to be held down by authenticity. In this film, which is set in the ’30s, I feel that I'm presenting authenticity of the heart. I'm not interested in everyday reality, but in the reality of the heart. I like fantasy, like a fairy tale. I'm interested in shadows and contrasts. It's like the opening scene in the movie, when a character says, `It's not what you think.' Well, it's probably what you think. But it's too complicated."

The movie was one of 14 films financed by Orion Pictures through a deal with HBO.

Shooting
The film was shot in London at Elstree Studios in 1985 over 11 weeks. "Gene calls it a 'comedy chiller'", said Gilda Radner. "For me, this is a part very similar to my own life. I wear a wedding gown in 95% of the movie. Since I didn't wear a gown when Gene and I got married, I asked the 'Haunted Honeymoon' photographer to make me a wedding album!" Radner said.

Wilder says his aim was to "make a 1930s movie for 1986." He and the cinematographer used no primary colors and lit the film darkly. "It's black and white in color", said Wilder. "The fat lady in Akron, Ohio, doesn't have to know that. But she should feel that it's believable in the way that an old '30s film is believable."

Wilder and Radner celebrated their first wedding anniversary during filming in September.

Jonathan Pryce later recalled, "It was one of those films where, when there's a break and they’re doing the next setup and people usually go back to their dressing rooms, nobody went back to their dressing rooms. We’d all sit around in a circle of camp chairs or whatever they call them—director's chairs—and be entertained by Dom DeLuise. It was a blissful time. It was a great time."

Wilder says he told DeLuise to play his role straight, telling him, "I want you to be my aunt. We'll get the laughs later. But first don't go for 'I'm-really-a-guy, I'm-really-a-guy, and-I'm-doing-this-little-joke.'"

Release
Orion elected not to screen the film to critics before general release. Producer Susan Ruskin said:

Reception
The film received negative reviews. On review aggregator website Rotten Tomatoes, the film holds an approval rating of 18%, based on eleven reviews, and an average rating of 3.6/10. Dom DeLuise won the Razzie Award for Worst Supporting Actress for his performance in drag. Audiences polled by CinemaScore gave the film an average grade "C−" on an A+ to F scale.

Alex Stewart reviewed Haunted Honeymoon for White Dwarf #83, and stated that "Amid Wilder's overindulgence in timid, repetitive gags, it's hard to sort out who's plotting with whom to bump off who else, and harder still to care. Only an admirably unpredictable performance from Dom DeLuise as wacky old Aunt Kate puts any kind of edge on the silliness at all."

Box office
The movie was a financial flop, grossing only $8,000,000 in America, entering the box office at number 8, then slipping to 14 the following week.

The movie represents the last feature film appearance for Radner (prior to her diagnosis and death from Ovarian cancer) and the last directorial role for Wilder. While Radner was struggling with cancer, she wrote the following about the film: 

Another source said the film earned $3.2 million in the US.

References

External links

 

Review of film at New York Times
Review of film at Los Angeles Times
Review of film at Variety
Film review at Tor

1986 films
1986 comedy films
1986 horror films
1980s comedy horror films
1980s English-language films
1980s parody films
American comedy horror films
American haunted house films
American werewolf films
Films directed by Gene Wilder
Films scored by John Morris
Films shot at EMI-Elstree Studios
Films with screenplays by Gene Wilder
Golan-Globus films
Golden Raspberry Award winning films
Orion Pictures films
Parodies of horror
1980s American films